William John Pulte was the founder and chairman of PulteGroup, one of the largest home construction and real estate development companies in the United States.

Biography

Early life and education
Pulte attended De La Salle Collegiate High School in Detroit. He was a three sport varsity athlete in football, track and basketball.

Career
In 1950, just after graduating high school, Pulte and 5 friends built a 5-room bungalow near Detroit City Airport, which they sold for $10,000.

In 1956, he founded William J. Pulte Inc. In 1959, he built his first subdivision.

In 2016, after Richard Dugas Jr., the former chief executive officer of the company, moved the headquarters of the company from Bloomfield Hills, Michigan to Atlanta and initiated a change in direction for the company, Bill Pulte, who owned 9% of the company, and his grandson, also named Bill Pulte, pressured Dugas to resign. Dugas resigned, and the stock price went up.

Death
Pulte had 14 children (and was predeceased by one). He divorced his first wife, and married Karen Koppal in 1993. Pulte died at his home in Naples, Florida, on March 7, 2018, at the age of 85.

References

1932 births
2018 deaths
American chairpersons of corporations
American company founders
American real estate businesspeople
Businesspeople from Detroit
20th-century American businesspeople